Tachiyazawagawa No.1 Dam is a gravity dam located in Yamagata Prefecture in Japan. The dam is used for power production. The catchment area of the dam is 69.7 km2. The dam impounds about 2  ha of land when full and can store 93 thousand cubic meters of water. The construction of the dam was completed in 1938.

References

Dams in Yamagata Prefecture
1938 establishments in Japan